Szczepanów  is a village in the administrative district of Gmina Środa Śląska, within Środa Śląska County, Lower Silesian Voivodeship, in south-western Poland.

See also
 Średzka Woda

References

Villages in Środa Śląska County